The Ness of Burgi is a narrow peninsula that stretches to the south from the Scat Ness headland of Mainland, Shetland, a Scottish island. It is in the parish of Dunrossness.

It terminates with the rocks of the Hog of the Ness.  
Offshore from the point are the Hog of the Holm and Horse Island.

The Ness of Burgi fort, probably built around 100 BC in the Iron Age, lies on the Ness.  The fort is isolated by a rampart and had a ditch on either side.
A ruined stone wall, now a low bank covered in turf, runs from side to side of the promontory and may be part of the fortification.
In 1935 the site was excavated by Miss C L Mowbray.
The fort is on a rocky promontory on the east side of the Ness and is open to the public at all times.

Gallery

References
Citations

Sources

Landforms of Shetland
Peninsulas of Scotland
Mainland, Shetland